Dyjice is a municipality and village in Jihlava District in the Vysočina Region of the Czech Republic. It has about 100 inhabitants.

Administrative parts
Villages of Dolní Dvorce, Dyjička and Stranná are administrative parts of Dyjice.

References

Villages in Jihlava District